Mazanderani dances, also known as Tabarian dances, are dances that are performed throughout the world by Mazandarani people, mostly on occasions such as weddings.

Types of Dances
 Lak Sema
 Dasmal Sema
 Majme Sema
 Lampa Sema
 Derum Bakordan (Tak Dast)
 Tesh Sema
 Chakka Sema
 Saz Sema
 Sema Hal

See also
 Mazandarani people
 Mazandarani music

References

Iranian dances